Oyré is a commune in the Vienne department in the Nouvelle-Aquitaine region in western France.

Geography

Demographics

See also
Communes of the Vienne department

References

External links

Official website of the commune

Communes of Vienne